Jhargram Kumud Kumari Institution (informally KKI) is a boys-only independent day school in Jhargram, West Bengal, India.It was founded in 1924 by the Raja Narasingha Malla Deb the King of Jhargram. It is the oldest school of Jhargram district and one of the oldest school of undivided Medinipur District. It is a school with a strength of almost 1300 students, as it evolved into a Government aided school with a managing committee, presently headed by Shivendra Bijoy Malla Deb the scion of Jhargram Royal family.

Academic affiliation
The school is affiliated to the"West Bengal Board of Secondary Education" (which holds the Madhyamik exams after grade 10) and "West Bengal Council of Higher Secondary Education" (conducted Higher secondary level or Pre-university level examination).

Uniform
The school students wear black shorts/trousers with white shirt. A colored monogram on the shirt pocket has been introduced from last few years. Footwear is black leather shoes with laces.
The school tie is black.

Curriculum
Students appear for 10+(Madhyamik) examination under West Bengal Board of Secondary Education and 12+(Higher Secondary Examination) examination under West Bengal Council of Higher Secondary Education. Grade 11 and 12 have three streams- Science, Arts and Commerce.

Alumni
Ex-students have achieved prominence in academics, politics, government service, medical, engineering, journalism, and literature.
Nitish Sengupta a cabinet ranked bureaucrat,politicians like Birendra Bijoy Malla Deb and Dr Sukumar Hansda  are alumni of this school. Internationally acclaimed poet and academician Dr Jaydeep Sarangi, Principal, New Alipore College, was a student of this school.

See also
Education in India
List of schools in India
Education in West Bengal

References

External links
 http://jhargramkki.org

Boys' schools in India
High schools and secondary schools in West Bengal
Schools in Jhargram district
Educational institutions established in 1924
1924 establishments in India